Hard or Smooth is the second album released by Wreckx-n-Effect. It was released on November 24, 1992, for MCA Records and featured production from Teddy Riley, Ty Fyffe, Riley's engineers Franklyn Grant and David Wynn and Wreckx-n—Effect. This marked Wreckx-n-Effect's first album following the death of member Brandon Mitchell, who was shot to death in 1990.

Hard or Smooth became a success for the group thanks in large part to the single "Rump Shaker". The album itself made it to #9 on the Billboard 200 and #6 on the Top R&B/Hip-Hop Albums chart. Several singles made it to the Billboard charts; "Rump Shaker" would make it to #2 on the Billboard Hot 100 and on the R&B/Hip-Hop Singles & Tracks, as well as #9 on the Hot Dance Music/Club Play; "Knock-N-Boots" made it to #72 on the Hot 100 and #71 on the R&B/Hip-Hop chart; "My Cutie" made it to #37 on the Hot Dance Music/Maxi-Singles Sales and #75 on the R&B/Hip-Hop chart; and "Wreckx Shop" made it to #11 on the Hot Rap Tracks and 46 on the R&B/Hip-Hop chart.

Track listing
"Rump Shaker" (Aqil Davidson, Markell Riley, Teddy Riley, David Wynn, Anton Hollins, Pharrell Williams) – 5:13
"New Jack Swing, Pt. 2" (hard version) (Aqil Davidson, Teddy Riley, Markell Riley, Tyrone Fyffe, Pharrell Williams, Franklyn Grant) – 4:50
"Wreckx Shop" (Aqil Davidson, Tyrone Fyffe, Teddy Riley, Markell Riley) – 4:39
"Knock-N-Boots" (Aqil Davidson, Teddy Riley, Menton L. Smith) – 4:51
"Here We Come" (Aqil Davidson, Teddy Riley, Markell Riley) – 4:27
"Tell Me How You Feel" (Aqil Davidson, Teddy Riley) – 4:59
"My Cutie" (Menton L. Smith, Teddy Riley) – 4:07
"Wreckx-N-Effect" (Aqil Davidson, Teddy Riley, Markell Riley) – 3:53
"Ez Come Ez Go (What Goes Up Must Come Down)" (Aqil Davidson, Teddy Riley, David Wynn) – 3:44
"Hard" (Teddy Riley, Aqil Davidson, Tyrone Fyffe) – 2:04
"Smooth" (Markell Riley, Tyrone Fyffe, Teddy Riley, Franklyn Grant, Menton L. Smith) – 2:59

Personnel
 Teddy Riley – all instruments, executive producer, mixing, recording engineer
 Tammy Lucas – background vocals
 Tyrone Fyffe – production, background vocals, scratches
 Franklyn Grant – production, recording engineer, mixing
 David Wynn – production, scratches
 Jean Marie Horvat – recording engineer, mixing
 Steve Thomas – scratches
 Darryl Shuler – background vocals
 Robert Nickerson – background vocals
 Dante Drew – background vocals
 Earl Thomas – assistant engineer
 Keston Wright – assistant engineer
 Steve Hall – mastering
 Todd Gray – photography
 Vartan – art direction
 DEY International – design

Samples
"Rump Shaker"
"Blues and Pants" by James Brown
"Darkest Light" by Lafayette Afro Rock Band
"Blind Alley" by The Emotions
"Midnight Theme" by Manzel
"I Like It" by DeBarge
"New Jack Swing, Pt. 2"
"Woman to Woman" by Joe Cocker
"The Bridge" by MC Shan
"School Boy Crush" by Average White Band
"Synthetic Substitution" by Melvin Bliss
"Just Rhymin' Wit Biz" by Biz Markie feat. Big Daddy Kane
"Wreckx Shop"
"Papa Was Too" by Joe Tex
"The Payback" by James Brown
"The Big Beat" by Billy Squier
"Knock-N-Boots"
"Think (About It)" by Lyn Collins
"Get Up Offa That Thing" by James Brown
"You'll Like It Too" by Funkadelic
"My Cutie"
"Hihache" by Lafayette Afro Rock Band
"Funky President (People It's Bad)" by James Brown
"Hard"
"Hard to Handle" by Otis Redding
"Synthetic Substitution" by Melvin Bliss
"Smooth"
"It's a New Day" by Skull Snaps
"Playing Your Game, Baby" by Barry White

Charts

Weekly charts

Year-end charts

Certifications

References

1992 albums
Wreckx-n-Effect albums
Albums produced by Teddy Riley